Ellie Moon is a Canadian-British actress, playwright and screenwriter.  Moon wrote the screenplay for and starred in the feature film Adult Adoption (2022). Her plays are published with Talonbooks.

Early life 
Moon grew up in Kingsville, Ontario and attended Kingsville District High School. She acted in theatre productions in her teens, and in an episode of WireTap, in a radio play segment written by host Jonathan Goldstein for Moon, after they met in an acting class. A dual citizen of the UK and Canada, Moon moved to England in her late teens.

Career 
Moon acted in theatre in London, UK, including productions at the Bush Theatre and the Tristan Bates Theatre (Off West End), before moving to Toronto. Moon then began her career in Toronto as a member of the acting company at Soulpepper Theatre Company in 2016–2017. She acted in her playwriting debut, Asking For It, which opened both Crow's Theatre and Nightwood Theatre's 2017–2018 seasons and sold out its run, with Intermission Magazine describing it as “an explosive debut”. 

Moon wrote and premiered two other plays in Toronto to positive reviews: What I Call Her (2018) at Crow's Theatre and This Was the World (2020) at Tarragon Theatre. During this time, she continued to work as an actor, including stage performances in A Doll's House, Part 2 at the Segal Centre for Performing Arts, It's a Wonderful Life at Soulpepper Theatre Company and Asking For It at Thousand Islands Playhouse. Moon acted in the feature film, The Last Porno Show (Toronto International Film Festival premiere, 2019) and in the television series Pretty Hard Cases, Murdoch Mysteries, Quantico and The Lost Symbol.  

Moon wrote the screenplay for, and starred in, the feature film, Adult Adoption (Glasgow Film Festival premiere, 2022). Adult Adoption follows Rosy (Moon), an adult former foster child who was never adopted and turns to an online service in search of a parent figure. The film received critical acclaim for its premiere and went on to screen at many other festivals internationally, closing its festival run at the 2022 Whistler Film Festival. Adult Adoption is scheduled for a limited theatrical release in Canada on January 14, 2023 and a US release on Valentine‘s Day.

Press

Moon's works as playwright have been described in The Globe and Mail as "a bracing pleasure", as well as "remarkable", "incredible", "astonishingly real", "a showcase of noteworthy skill", "a questing work of art", and "simple and achingly lovely". Martha Schabas writes: "The real marvel here might be how good Moon is at getting under our skin. Her writing demands a kind of interpolation.".

Of Adult Adoption, Kat Hughes for The Hollywood News writes: “Moon’s script & performance shine in Karen Knox’s fantastically constructed world. Adult Adoption is well on its way to become this era’s (slightly more grown-up) Juno.”  Nico Marrone for The Wee Review, Scotland's arts & culture magazine: “Simply put, Adult Adoption is incredible.”  SpoilerTV described the film as “a quirky, free-spirited triumph” starring “a brilliant Ellie Moon”.

Bibliography as writer

Plays 
Essential, 2020
This Was the World, 2020
What I Call Her, 2018
Asking For It, 2017

Film 
Adult Adoption, 2022

Publications 
 Asking For It and Other Plays: Asking For It and What I Call Her (2020)

Other 
Moon created the Secret Shakespeare Series in 2016. It operated until 2018 and raised thousands of dollars for Canadian charities including Leap Manifesto and Street Haven Women's Shelter.

References

Year of birth missing (living people)
Living people
21st-century Canadian dramatists and playwrights
21st-century Canadian actresses
21st-century Canadian women writers
Canadian women dramatists and playwrights
Canadian stage actresses
Canadian film actresses
21st-century Canadian screenwriters
Canadian women screenwriters